CBN is an Australian television station licensed to, and serving the regions surrounding Orange, Dubbo and central and southern New South Wales.

History

Origins
CBN-8 Orange commenced broadcasting on 17 March 1962, licensed to Country Broadcasting Services, owners of local radio station 2GZ. They soon changed their name to Country Television Services. CWN-6 Dubbo began transmission on 1 December 1965. Also owned by Country Television Services, they became the first station to completely relay another station's programming, although some station identification, such as test patterns, remained separate and program output for CWN originated from CBN's studios in Orange.

In 1968, the stations acquired access to the Postmaster-General's microwave link, allowing viewers to see national news programs and other major events live for the first time. By the early 1970s, the stations began to run into financial difficulties, and it was decided to enter into a joint programming agreement with PMTN-9 of Griffith, resulting in the formation of the Television 6-8-9 network (later Mid State Television).

A 30-minute documentary on the 1978 National Rodeo Titles, called Goin' Down The Road, won the station the 'Outstanding Contribution by a Regional Station' Logie Award in 1979. Local programming in the 1980s included Focus, Rural Roundup, Early Shift, Weekend Report, Time to Live, Around The Schools, and coverage of local special events.

Local sports coverage, especially of tennis and rugby, former a major part of the schedule in the late 1970s and early 1980s. From 1979, the station sponsored, and telecast the United Permanent Tennis Tournament, the only tournament of its kind in Australia.

With aggregation looming, CBN and CWN were purchased by health care magnate Paul Ramsay's Ramcorp Ltd in 1987, and merged with RVN/AMV to form Prime Television, in May 1988. Local programming and staff levels were reduced - morale at the time was reported  to be at an all time low. Programming schedules began to resemble those of  affiliation partner Seven, with new facilities built in Wollongong and Canberra in preparation for the expansion in coverage area.

Aggregation 
When aggregation in southern New South Wales occurred in 1989, CBN and CWN were effectively merged into one station, CBN, branded on-air as Prime Television. The station then moved into the rest of the new license area, competing against WIN Television and 10 Capital. The introduction of the two new stations into Orange was delayed by technical problems, and did not start in the area until later in the year.

In 1991, the Wagga Wagga and Orange licenses were merged into the one license, with RVN taking on the CBN callsign.

Seven News 
CBN produces and broadcasts two 30-minute Seven News bulletins, formerly (Prime7 News and Prime News) bulletins for the Central West (Orange/Dubbo) and Wagga Wagga regional markets, each weeknight at 6pm and is co-presented by Madelaine Collignon, with Kirstie Fitzpatrick presenting the weather. As of April 2015, both bulletins are pre-recorded.

In the Wollongong and Canberra regional markets, short two-minute updates are presented by Phoebe Deas, with weather forecasts from Daniel Gibson. Both these markets take Sydney's Seven News bulletin for the 6pm primetime news service.

Since August 2010, production of Seven News for the Orange and Wagga Wagga markets moved to Seven's Canberra headquarters. The two bulletins alternate between live transmission and being pre-recorded, prior to the addition of the North West and North Coast bulletins on 27 April 2015, due to the closure of the Tamworth broadcast studios on 24 April. On that same day, a renovated news studio was introduced for both bulletins. However, with the centralisation of all bulletins, the alternate live-recorded format for southern NSW was displaced to the live North West bulletin.

Main Transmitters

Notes

References

External links 
 Logos and clips of CBN and CWN at AusTVHistory.com
 CBN8 entry at the Australian Television Archive
 CWN6 entry at the Australian Television Archive

Television stations in New South Wales
Television stations in Canberra
Prime Media Group
Seven Network
Television channels and stations established in 1962
1962 establishments in Australia